Joseph-Arthur Labissonnière was a politician in Quebec, Canada and an official opposition Member of the Legislative Assembly of Quebec (MLA).

Early life

He was born on December 25, 1875, in Batiscan, Mauricie and was a farmer.

Member of the legislature

He ran as a Conservative candidate in the district of in the provincial district of Champlain in 1912 and won against Liberal incumbent Pierre-Calixte Neault.  He lost re-election in 1916.  He was succeeded by Liberal Bruno Bordeleau.

Labissonnière tried to make a political comeback but was defeated again in 1923.

Town Politics

Bordeleau served as Mayor of Champlain from 1917 to 1922.

Death

He died on May 9, 1930, in Champlain.

Footnotes

See also
Champlain Provincial Electoral District
Mauricie

1875 births
1930 deaths
Mayors of places in Quebec
Conservative Party of Quebec MNAs